Tampering can refer to many forms of sabotage but the term is often used to mean intentional modification of products in a way that would make them harmful to the consumer.  This threat has prompted manufacturers to make products that are either difficult to modify or at least difficult to modify without warning the consumer that the product has been tampered with.  Since the person making the modification is typically long gone by the time the crime is discovered, many of these cases are never solved.

The crime is often linked with attempts to extort money from the manufacturer, and in many cases no contamination to a product ever takes place.  Fraud is sometimes handled as a matter of civil law, but actual modification of products is almost always a matter of criminal law.

Examples

1982 Chicago Tylenol murders 

Seven people died in this incident in the United States after taking medication that had been contaminated with cyanide.  One man was later convicted of extortion, but no one was convicted of the murders.  In 2009, the Federal Bureau of Investigation announced that it was re-examining the case.  This event led to new requirements for tamper-evident seals on over-the-counter medications and changes in US tampering laws.

Foreign objects 

Tampering cases often involve foreign objects in food products.  These cases often focus on determining whether the contamination occurred during manufacturing, either accidentally or intentionally, or whether the claims made by the complaining customers are real or fraudulent.

Fraudulent claims 

A famous case involving claims by customers that had tainted the products themselves was a series of claims in 1993 of needles found in Pepsi products.  The manufacturer convincingly demonstrated that the contamination could not have taken place at the bottling plant, and several people were proven to have put the needles in themselves.

Hardware Trojan 
Hardware Trojan (HT), malicious modification of the circuitry of an integrated circuit.

2018 Australian strawberry contamination 

A strawberry tampering crisis where sewing needles were found in a large number of consumer strawberry brands in several Australian states, leading to supermarkets halting strawberry sales for weeks, and forcing farms to dump and burn hundreds of tonnes of produce.

References

External links 

 Federal Anti-Tampering Act (US)
 Five major product tampering cases CBC News, 2 August 2012
Crimes
Property crimes